The 2018 municipal elections in Ontario were held on October 22, 2018.

Voters in the province of Ontario elected mayors, councillors, school board trustees and all other elected officials in all of the province's municipalities.

Electoral period
As per the Ontario Municipal Elections Act, 1996, nomination papers for candidates for municipal and school board elections could be filed from May 1, 2018, at which time the campaign period began.

Nominations closed on July 27, 2018, at 2 PM local time. Certification of nomination papers was completed by 4 PM on July 30, 2018.

Voting was on October 22 from 10 AM to 8 PM.

Ranked ballots
In 2016, the provincial government passed Bill 181, the Municipal Elections Modernization Act, which permitted municipalities to adopt ranked ballots for municipal elections.

London was the only municipality to use ranked ballots in the 2018 election itself, with the decision in that city being made by London City Council in 2017, while Kingston and Cambridge held referendums concurrently with their 2018 elections on whether to adopt ranked ballots for the next municipal elections in 2022. Both of the referendums passed, though neither reached the 50 per cent turnout required to make the results legally binding.

In 2020, the provincial government passed Bill 218, the Supporting Ontario's Recovery Act, which, among other things, eliminated the option of ranked balloting for municipalities. The City of London will now have to switch back to first-past-the-post for its 2022 municipal elections.

Online voting
The 2018 elections were also noted for a significant increase in the adoption of online voting. Across Ontario, over 150 municipalities conducted their elections primarily online, with physical polling stations either abandoned entirely or limited to only a few central polling stations for voters who could not or did not want to vote online.

On election day, however, 51 of those municipalities, all of which had selected Dominion Voting Systems as their online voting contractor, were affected by a technical failure. According to Dominion the company's colocation centre provider imposed a bandwidth cap, without authorization from or consultation with Dominion, due to the massive increase in voting traffic in the early evening, thus making it impossible for many voters to get through to the server between 5:00 and 7:30 p.m. All of the affected municipalities extended voting for at least a few hours to compensate for the outage; several, including Pembroke, Waterloo, Prince Edward County and Greater Sudbury, opted to extend voting for a full 24 hours into the evening of October 23.

Counties
2018 Bruce County municipal elections
2018 Dufferin County municipal elections
2018 Elgin County municipal elections
2018 Essex County municipal elections
2018 Frontenac County municipal elections
2018 Grey County municipal elections
2018 Haliburton County municipal elections
2018 Hastings County municipal elections
2018 Huron County municipal elections
2018 Lambton County municipal elections
2018 Lanark County municipal elections
2018 Leeds and Grenville United Counties municipal elections
2018 Lennox and Addington County municipal elections
2018 Middlesex County municipal elections
2018 Northumberland County municipal elections
2018 Perth County municipal elections
2018 Peterborough County municipal elections
2018 Prescott and Russell United Counties municipal elections
2018 Renfrew County municipal elections
2018 Simcoe County municipal elections
2018 Stormont, Dundas and Glengarry United Counties municipal elections
2018 Wellington County municipal elections

Regional municipalities
 2018 Durham Region municipal elections
 2018 Halton Region municipal elections
 2018 Muskoka District municipal elections
 2018 Niagara Region municipal elections
 2018 Oxford County municipal elections
 2018 Peel Region municipal elections
 2018 Waterloo Region municipal elections
 2018 York Region municipal elections

Districts
2018 Algoma District municipal elections
2018 Cochrane District municipal elections
2018 Kenora District municipal elections
2018 Manitoulin District municipal elections
2018 Nipissing District municipal elections
2018 Parry Sound District municipal elections
2018 Rainy River District municipal elections
2018 Sudbury District municipal elections
2018 Thunder Bay District municipal elections
2018 Timiskaming District municipal elections

Single tier municipalities

Brant

Brantford

Chatham-Kent

Mayor

Chatham-Kent Municipal Council
The results for Chatham-Kent municipal council is as follows:

Greater Sudbury

Haldimand County

Mayor

Haldimand County Municipal Council
The results for Haldimand County Council are as follows:

Hamilton

Kawartha Lakes

Mayor

Kawartha Lakes Municipal Council
For 2018, the Kawartha Lakes council will be reduced from 16 to 8 seats, plus the mayor.

The results for Kawartha Lakes council are as follows:

Norfolk County
The following are the results for Norfolk County.

Mayor

Norfolk County Council
There were some slight alterations to Norfolk County's ward map.

By-election
A by-election was held on June 3, 2021, in Ward 2 to fill the vacancy of Roger Geysens who retired.

Ottawa

Prince Edward County

Mayor
The following are the results for Prince Edward County.

Toronto

Separated municipalities

Barrie

Belleville

The following are the results for Belleville.

Mayor

Councillors

Brockville
The following are the results for Brockville.

Mayor

Councillors
Eight Councillors were elected.

Cornwall

Mayor

Cornwall City Council
The results for Cornwall city council are as follows:

Gananoque

Mayor

Guelph

Mayor

Guelph City Council
Two councillors to be elected in each ward. Results for Guelph city council are as follows.

Kingston

Referendum
Referendum on ranked ballots. The "yes" side won decidedly with 62%, but the turnout to make the referendum binding did not reach the 50% mark. However, Kingston City Council has promised to pursue the matter anyway.

Mayor

Kingston City Council
The results for Kingston city council are as follows:

London

Orillia

Mayor

Pelee
The results for Pelee Island were as follows:

Mayor

Peterborough
The following are the results for Peterborough.

Mayor

Councillors
Two councillors were elected from each of the 5 wards.

Pembroke

Mayor

Prescott

Mayor

Quinte West

Mayor

Quinte West City Council
Elections results for Quinte West city council are as follows:

St. Marys

Stratford

Smiths Falls

St. Thomas
Source:

Mayor

St. Thomas City Council
The results for St. Thomas city council are as follows:

Windsor

References

Notes